The 1931–32 Egypt Cup was the 12th edition of the Egypt Cup.

The final was held on 5 May 1933. The match was contested by Al Ahly and Olympic Club, with Olympic winning 4–1.

Quarter-finals

Semi-finals

Final

References 

 

3
Egypt Cup
1932–33 in Egyptian football